Lorenzo Marto "Chico" Fernández Mosquera (April 23, 1939 – November 30, 2020) was a Cuban professional baseball player who appeared in 24 games played during  for the Baltimore Orioles of Major League Baseball.

Fernández was primarily a shortstop and second baseman during his minor league career, which began in 1958 in the Detroit Tigers' system. In 1962, Lorenzo Fernández departed the Detroit organization briefly, playing in the Milwaukee Braves' system, and the next year he joined the Chicago White Sox organization. Baltimore acquired him after the  season. He made the 1968 Orioles' Major League roster out of spring training. In his debut, as a pinch hitter on April 20 against the California Angels at Anaheim Stadium, he singled off Angel pitcher Bobby Locke in the eighth inning of a 10–1 Oriole triumph. It would be almost four months (August 16) before he would get his second hit, also a pinch single and this off Minnesota Twins' left-hander Jim Kaat.

Fernández started only two games, a doubleheader against the Athletics at Oakland on June 16. Otherwise he served as a late-inning replacement for regular Baltimore shortstop Mark Belanger or second baseman Davey Johnson.  He compiled 19 plate appearances and included one base on balls with his two hits during the season.  He briefly played for the 1969 Rochester Red Wings before leaving the game.

Fernández died November 30, 2020.

References

External links
, or Pura Pelota (Venezuelan Winter League)

1939 births
2020 deaths
Baltimore Orioles players
Decatur Commodores players
Denver Bears players
Durham Bulls players
Evansville White Sox players
Florida Instructional League White Sox players
Indianapolis Indians players
Knoxville Smokies players
Louisville Colonels (minor league) players
Lynchburg White Sox players
Major League Baseball infielders
Major League Baseball players from Cuba
Cuban expatriate baseball players in the United States
Montgomery Rebels players
Navegantes del Magallanes players
Rochester Red Wings players
Baseball players from Havana